Sudhir Kumar Baliyan is a leader of Bharatiya Janata Party from Uttar Pradesh. He served as cabinet minister in Kalyan Singh ministry.  He was a member of Uttar Pradesh Legislative Assembly elected from Khatauli in Muzaffarnagar district.

References

Living people
State cabinet ministers of Uttar Pradesh
People from Muzaffarnagar district
Year of birth missing (living people)
Uttar Pradesh MLAs 1991–1993
Bharatiya Janata Party politicians from Uttar Pradesh
Uttar Pradesh MLAs 1993–1996